Oxyna is a genus of fruit flies in the family Tephritidae. There are at least 20 described species in Oxyna.

Species
These 27 species belong to the genus Oxyna:

Oxyna albipila Loew, 1869
Oxyna albofasciata Chen, 1938
Oxyna amurensis Hendel, 1927
Oxyna aterrima (Doane, 1899)
Oxyna distincta Chen, 1938
Oxyna dracunculina Richter, 1990
Oxyna fenestrata (Zetterstedt, 1847)
Oxyna flavipennis (Loew, 1844)
Oxyna fusca Chen, 1938
Oxyna gansuica Wang, 1996
Oxyna guttatofasciata (Loew, 1850)
Oxyna longicauda Korneyev, 1990
Oxyna lutulenta Loew, 1869
Oxyna maculata (Robineau-Desvoidy, 1830)
Oxyna menyuanica Wang, 1996
Oxyna nasuta Hering, 1936
Oxyna nebulosa (Wiedemann, 1817)
Oxyna obesa Loew, 1862
Oxyna palpalis (Coquillett, 1904)
Oxyna parietina (Linnaeus, 1758)
Oxyna parva Chen, 1938
Oxyna stackelbergi Korneyev, 1990
Oxyna superflava Freidberg, 1974
Oxyna tarbagatajensis Korneyev, 1990
Oxyna tianshanica Korneyev, 1990
Oxyna utahensis Quisenberry, 1949
Oxyna variabilis Chen, 1938

References

External links

 
 

Tephritinae
Diptera of North America
Diptera of Europe
Diptera of Asia
Diptera of Africa